Julius Lansburgh Furniture Co., Inc., also known as the Old Masonic Temple, is an historic building at 901 F Street, Northwest, Washington, D.C., in the Penn Quarter neighborhood.

History
The French Renaissance Revival building was designed by Adolf Cluss, and  Joseph Wildrich von Kammerhueber in 1867. Construction began in June 1867; the cornerstone was laid in May 1868, by President Andrew Johnson; it was dedicated on March 20, 1870.
The building cost $100,000, but a mansard roof fifth floor, was not completed because of lack of funds. There is a full basement.
First-floor stores were leased, and a grand ballroom on the second-floor was rented out.

Julius Lansburgh purchased the Old Masonic Temple in 1921. 
The building was painted white in 1922,
and operated as a furniture store.
After Lansburgh's closed in 1970, it was listed as an historic building in 1974.
In December 1979, the District of Columbia refused to issue a demolition permit in accordance with its historic preservation law.
The building was renovated in 2000, at a cost of $33 million.
It serves as the headquarters of the Gallup Organization.

References

External links

http://streetsofwashington.blogspot.com/2010/02/f-street-stroll-circa-1909.html
http://dcmemorials.com/index_indiv0000412.htm
http://www.goethe.de/ins/us/was/pro/vtour/dc1/B2/22/en_index.htm
http://www.loc.gov/pictures/item/2004667755/

Clubhouses on the National Register of Historic Places in Washington, D.C.
Masonic buildings completed in 1870
Former Masonic buildings in Washington, D.C.
French Renaissance Revival architecture
Office buildings in Washington, D.C.